Joshua J. Kennedy (born 25 August 1987) is a former Australian rules footballer who played for the West Coast Eagles in the Australian Football League (AFL). He previously played for Carlton from 2006 to 2007 and is regarded as one of the best key-forwards of his generation.

Kennedy is originally from Melbourne but grew up in Northampton, Western Australia. He played football for East Fremantle in the West Australian Football League (WAFL) before being drafted to Carlton with the fourth pick in the 2005 National Draft. After two seasons at Carlton, he was traded to West Coast at the end of the 2007 season as part of a deal involving club captain Chris Judd. Kennedy soon established himself as West Coast's leading key forward. He has led the club goalkicking six times, firstly in 2011 and then in five consecutive seasons from 2013 onwards. In 2014, he briefly served as acting co-captain following the retirement of Darren Glass. Kennedy won consecutive Coleman Medals in 2015 and 2016 as the league's leading goalkicker, and was runner-up in 2017. He was also named in the All-Australian team in each of those years. In 2022, Kennedy kicked his 700th goal, becoming the first Eagles player to reach the milestone.

Early life and junior career
Kennedy was born in Melbourne, and grew up in Canberra, Townsville, and Perth, with his family finally settling in Northampton, a small country town north of Geraldton, Western Australia. His parents, Jenny Peterson and Jamie Kennedy, both played basketball professionally in the Women's National Basketball League and National Basketball League, respectively, having first met as scholarship holders at the Australian Institute of Sport (AIS). Kennedy played both football and basketball growing up, and he represented Western Australia's state under-16 basketball team. He later concentrated on football, playing for Northampton in the Great Northern Football League (GNFL). Kennedy played for the state football team at both under-16 and under-18 level, and he was named in the under-18 All-Australian team at conclusion of the 2005 AFL Under-18 Championships. He had attended the AIS/AFL Academy in Canberra the previous year, and toured Ireland with an academy side, playing several international rules matches, and thus became the first child of two previous AIS scholarship holders to also attend the institute. With Northampton falling into the recruitment zone of the Perth-based East Fremantle Football Club, Kennedy made his senior (WAFL) debut during the 2005 season, finishing with six goals from six games. He was selected by Carlton with pick four in the 2005 National Draft, held in November 2005.

Senior career
In 2006, Kennedy showed promises that he could be a future key-position forward, having made his debut in Round 6. However, he struggled for ground time and form when playing at AFL level, scoring only 5.4 from his nine games. In Carlton's , the Northern Bullants, he found it easier to show his skills with eighteen goals for the season.

In 2007, Kennedy committed to a new 2-year contract with the Carlton Football Club. However, on 11 October, it was announced that he had agreed to instead return to his native state and play for the West Coast Eagles, thus enabling Carlton to secure the services of top midfielder Chris Judd in a trade.

On 26 April 2008, Kennedy, wearing number 17, made his debut for the Eagles.

In Round 9, 2011, Kennedy kicked ten goals against the Western Bulldogs, becoming just the fourth Eagle (after Scott Cummings, Peter Sumich and Mark LeCras) to kick ten goals in a game.

After playing in struggling teams at the start of his career – four of Kennedy's first six seasons resulted in bottom two finishes, including two wooden spoons, one each at Carlton and West Coast respectively, Kennedy made his first finals appearance in 2011. Kennedy won only 14 of the first 67 matches of his career. However his record has since improved; as of the end of 2012, he has won 23 of his last 32 matches to have a career win-draw-loss record of 37–1–61.

In the 2013 AFL season, Kennedy was in front of the Coleman Medal nearly every week. But with the Eagles losing their last three games by an average margin of 71 points and Kennedy being goal-less in each of them, he lost his chance of winning the medal.

On 30 March 2014, Kennedy played his 100th game for the Eagles, kicking four goals and one behind in a 93-point thrashing of Melbourne at the MCG. In Round 8, 2014, Kennedy bagged 11 goals straight in a 111-point win over the Giants. He would then go on to kick bags of 7 and 8 both against the Suns. He finished the year with 61 goals. After Darren Glass retired midway through the season, Kennedy was named acting co-captain of the club for the remainder of 2014, along with four other players.

On 10 April 2015, Kennedy kicked 10 goals again against Carlton. It was the third time that he brought up the double figures, kicking 6 of his 10 goals in the third quarter. His tenth goal for the night was also his 300th for his career. At the end of the Home and Away season, Kennedy finished with 75 goals and became the second West Coast player to win the Coleman Medal.

On 21 May 2016, after kicking 5 goals in the previous match, Kennedy bagged 7 goals against Port Adelaide to bring his career tally to 400 goals. He went on to secure back to back Coleman Medals in the same year, scoring a total of 82 goals.

Kennedy kicked his 500th career goal in Round 20 of the 2017 AFL season. He then kicked his 500th goal for West Coast two weeks later in Round 22, becoming only the second player in club history to do so (after Peter Sumich).

On 29 April 2018, Kennedy became West Coast's all-time leading goalkicker, overtaking Sumich with his 515th goal for the Eagles during the Western Derby. Kennedy scored three goals in West Coast's 2018 premiership win.

In July 2022, Kennedy kicked his 700th goal for West Coast against Carlton, and a month later announced his retirement from the AFL.

Kennedy decided to make his final game a home game in the Round 21 match against Adelaide on Sunday, August 7, 2022. Despite Adelaide winning by 16 points, Kennedy recorded an 8-goal and 2 behinds haul and was chaired off to a standing ovation and a guard of honour by both teams. In a gesture of appreciation, Kennedy personally shook the hands of the entire Adelaide team, including their entire on-field support staff.

Statistics
 Statistics are correct to the end of the 2021 season

|- style="background-color: #EAEAEA"
! scope="row" style="text-align:center" | 2006
|style="text-align:center;"|
| 5 || 9 || 5 || 4 || 36 || 16 || 52 || 32 || 11 || 0.6 || 0.4 || 4.0 || 1.8 || 5.8 || 3.6 || 1.2 || 0
|-
! scope="row" style="text-align:center" | 2007
|style="text-align:center;"|
| 5 || 13 || 6 || 5 || 57 || 40 || 97 || 50 || 27 || 0.5 || 0.4 || 4.4 || 3.1 || 7.5 || 3.8 || 2.1 || 0
|- style="background-color: #EAEAEA"
! scope="row" style="text-align:center" | 2008
|style="text-align:center;"|
| 17 || 7 || 7 || 4 || 55 || 34 || 89 || 46 || 7 || 1.0 || 0.6 || 7.9 || 4.9 || 12.7 || 6.6 || 1.0 || 0
|-
! scope="row" style="text-align:center" | 2009
|style="text-align:center;"|
| 17 || 16 || 31 || 17 || 150 || 52 || 202 || 110 || 28 || 1.9 || 1.1 || 9.4 || 3.3 || 12.6 || 6.9 || 1.8 || 0
|- style="background-color: #EAEAEA"
! scope="row" style="text-align:center" | 2010
|style="text-align:center;"|
| 17 || 22 || 41 || 19 || 199 || 61 || 260 || 130 || 60 || 1.9 || 0.9 || 9.0 || 2.8 || 11.8 || 5.9 || 2.7 || 3
|-
! scope="row" style="text-align:center" | 2011
|style="text-align:center;"|
| 17 || 23 || 59 || 38 || 208 || 62 || 270 || 144 || 70 || 2.6 || 1.7 || 9.0 || 2.7 || 11.7 || 6.3 || 3.0 || 4
|- style="background-color: #EAEAEA"
! scope="row" style="text-align:center" | 2012
|style="text-align:center;"|
| 17 || 9 || 18 || 14 || 58 || 16 || 74 || 43 || 13 || 2.0 || 1.6 || 6.4 || 1.8 || 8.2 || 4.8 || 1.4 || 3
|-
! scope="row" style="text-align:center" | 2013
|style="text-align:center;"|
| 17 || 21 || 60 || 23 || 210 || 63 || 273 || 143 || 69 || 2.9 || 1.1 || 10.0 || 3.0 || 13.0 || 6.8 || 3.3 || 6
|- style="background-color: #EAEAEA"
! scope="row" style="text-align:center" | 2014
|style="text-align:center;"|
| 17 || 20 || 61 || 33 || 175 || 51 || 226 || 114 || 62 || 3.1 || 1.7 || 8.8 || 2.6 || 11.3 || 5.7 || 3.1 || 11
|-
! scope="row" style="text-align:center" | 2015
|style="text-align:center;"|
| 17 || 25 || style="background:#CAE1FF; width:1em" | 80† || style="background:#CAE1FF; width:1em" | 55† || 241 || 92 || 333 || 168 || 52 || style="background:#CAE1FF; width:1em" | 3.2† || style="background:#CAE1FF; width:1em" | 2.2† || 9.6 || 3.7 || 13.3 || 6.7 || 2.1 || 12
|- style="background-color: #EAEAEA"
! scope="row" style="text-align:center" | 2016
|style="text-align:center;"|
| 17 || 23|| style="background:#CAE1FF; width:1em" | 82† || 37 || 229 || 71 || 300 || 148 || 69 || style="background:#CAE1FF; width:1em" | 3.6† || 1.6 || 9.9 || 3.0 || 12.9 || 6.4 || 3.1 || 17
|-
! scope="row" style="text-align:center" | 2017
|style="text-align:center;"|
| 17 || 19 || 69 || 39 || 166 || 59 || 225 || 111 || 27 || style="background:#CAE1FF; width:1em" | 3.6† || 2.1 || 8.7 || 3.1 || 11.8 || 5.8 || 1.4 || 13
|- style="background-color: #EAEAEA"
| scope=row bgcolor=F0E68C | 2018#
|style="text-align:center;"|
| 17 || 14 || 43 || 20 || 117 || 38 || 155 || 68 || 28 || style="background:#CAE1FF; width:1em" | 3.1† || 1.4 || 8.4 || 2.7 || 11.1 || 4.9 || 2.0 || 4
|-
! scope="row" style="text-align:center" | 2019
|style="text-align:center;"|
| 17 || 22 || 49 || 29 || 132 || 51 || 183 || 89 || 39 || 2.2 || 1.3 || 6.0 || 2.3 || 8.3 || 4.0 || 1.8 || 3
|- style="background-color: #EAEAEA"
! scope="row" style="text-align:center" | 2020
|style="text-align:center;"|
| 17 || 17 || 34 || 22 || 96 || 23 || 119 || 69 || 16 || 2.0 || 1.3 || 5.7 || 1.4 || 7.0 || 4.1 || 0.9 || 6
|-
! scope="row" style="text-align:center" | 2021
|style="text-align:center;"|
| 17 || 18 || 41 || 21 || 131 || 47 || 178 || 89 || 21 || 2.3 || 1.2 || 7.3 || 2.6 || 9.9 || 4.9 || 1.2 || 2
|- class="sortbottom"
! colspan=3| Career
! 278
! 686
! 380
! 2260
! 776
! 3036
! 1554
! 599
! 2.5
! 1.4
! 8.1
! 2.8
! 10.9
! 5.6
! 2.2
! 84
|}

Honours and achievements
AFL

1x AFL Premiership Player: 2018
2x Coleman Medallist: 2015, 2016
3x All-Australian: 2015 (vc), 2016, 2017 (vc)
2x All-Australian 40-man Squad: 2011, 2013
Carlton Pre-Season Premiership Side: 2007

West Coast Eagles 

 8x West Coast leading goalkicker: 2011, 2013, 2014, 2015, 2016, 2017, 2020, 2022
Vice-captain: 2014–2022
Chris Mainwaring Medallist: 2015
3x Glendinning-Allan Medallist: 2016 (round 20), 2017 (round 6), 2020 (round 7)
Eagles in the Community Award: 2016
Life Membership: 2016

Personal life
Kennedy married long-time girlfriend Lauren Atkinson, an artist, in October 2016. They had previously been together since 2008 and have two daughters.
Kennedy also has 2 siblings, an older brother Scott and sister Melissa.

References

External links

Josh Kennedy Profile in Blueseum

1987 births
Australian rules footballers from Western Australia
Carlton Football Club players
East Fremantle Football Club players
Living people
Preston Football Club (VFA) players
People from Northampton, Western Australia
Australian rules footballers from Melbourne
West Coast Eagles players
West Coast Eagles Premiership players
Coleman Medal winners
All-Australians (AFL)
One-time VFL/AFL Premiership players